The literature of West Virginia, U.S.A., includes fiction, poetry, and nonfiction. Representative writers include Pearl S. Buck, Rebecca Harding Davis, Keith Maillard and Melville Davisson Post.

History

See also
 
 List of newspapers in West Virginia
 Appalachia#Literature
 :Category:West Virginia in fiction
 Southern United States literature
 American literary regionalism
 :Category:Libraries in West Virginia

References

Bibliography

 
  
 
 
 
 
 
 
 
  
 
  + Literary Scene pp. 506–520. (Fulltext)
 
 
 
 
  (Anthology)
  (Bibliography)

External links
  (Directory ceased in 2017)
 . (Subject guide)
 
 

Writers from West Virginia
American literature by state
Literature